The Consultant Orthodontists Group (COG) is a group which represents consultant orthodontists in the United Kingdom
the COG was established in 1964 to represent consultant orthodontists working in the hospital service and the membership was limited to orthodontists holding consultant contracts in the National Health Service. Relationships with oral surgeons was a particular concern of the group in the early years and although it was primarily a political organisation, the COG held clinical and political meetings biannually and attendance was restricted to members of the group. It has established strong links with the Royal Surgical Colleges and the British Dental Association (BDA) through it representatives on the BDA Central Committee for Hospital Dental Services (CCHDS) and was often regarded as the political voice of orthodontists. Almost all members of the group were members of the British Society for the Study of Orthodontics (BSSO) and about 70 members belonged to the British Association of Orthodontists (BAO) as well.

See also
British Orthodontic Society

References

Organizations established in 1964
Dental organisations based in the United Kingdom
Orthodontic organizations
1964 establishments in the United Kingdom